GK Persei (also Nova Persei 1901) was a bright nova first observed on Earth in 1901. It was discovered by Thomas David Anderson, an Edinburgh clergyman, at 02:40 UT on 22 February 1901 when it was at magnitude 2.7. It reached a maximum magnitude of 0.2, the brightest nova of modern times until Nova Aquilae 1918. After fading into obscurity at about magnitude 12 to 13 during the early 20th century, GK Persei began displaying infrequent outbursts of 2 to 3 magnitudes (about 7 to 15 times quiescent brightness). Since about 1980, these outbursts have become quite regular, typically lasting about two months and occurring about every three years. Thus, GK Persei seems to have changed from a classical nova like Nova Aquilae 1918 to something resembling a typical dwarf nova-type cataclysmic variable star.

Surrounding GK Persei is the Firework nebula, a nova remnant first detected in 1902 consisting of an expanding cloud of gas and dust bubbles moving up to 1200 km/s.

GK Persei has precise parallaxes reported from Gaia DR2 and Gaia EDR3, but these are thought to be badly affected by the binary nature of the system.  The Hubble Space Telescope has used a different method to derive the distance to GK Persei using nebular expansion velocity and compares that with its own astrometric parallax calculation.  This gave a somewhat smaller parallax (larger distance) than the Gaia measurements.

Properties
Novae consist of a main-sequence to giant star that accretes mass onto a white dwarf. The two stars of GK Persei orbit each other with a period of nearly 2 days. The donor star, having donated much of its mass to the white dwarf, is only  despite being a subgiant star.

Gallery

References

External links
 http://www.daviddarling.info/encyclopedia/N/Nova_Persei_1901.html
 http://lheawww.gsfc.nasa.gov/users/mukai/iphome/systems/gkper.html
 GK Persei from the AAVSO
 APOD: GK Per: Nova of 1901, 2011 November 5
 GK Persei by Chandra
 Video showing the expansion of the nova remnant

Novae
Nova remnants
Perseus (constellation)
1901 in science
19010221
Persei, GK
B-type stars
Intermediate polars
K-type subdwarfs
1057
021629
K-type subgiants